Gaber Ahmed Farhan Mohamed (born September 1, 1985), known as Gaber Mohamed, is an Egyptian male weightlifter, competing in the 105 kg category and representing Egypt at international competitions. He participated in the men's 105 kg event at the 2015 World Weightlifting Championships, and at the 2016 Summer Olympics, finishing in twelfth position. Mohamed also won the gold medal in the same weight category at the 2015 African Games.

Major results

References

External links
 
 
 

1985 births
Living people
Egyptian male weightlifters
Place of birth missing (living people)
Weightlifters at the 2016 Summer Olympics
Olympic weightlifters of Egypt
African Games gold medalists for Egypt
African Games medalists in weightlifting
Mediterranean Games gold medalists for Egypt
Mediterranean Games silver medalists for Egypt
Mediterranean Games medalists in weightlifting
Competitors at the 2015 African Games
Competitors at the 2009 Mediterranean Games
Competitors at the 2019 African Games
African Games silver medalists for Egypt
20th-century Egyptian people
21st-century Egyptian people